MZKT (МЗКТ or МЗКЦ, Minsk Wheel(ed) Tractor Plant (MWTP)) is a manufacturer of heavy off-road vehicles, especially military trucks, based in Minsk, in Belarus; it was formerly a division of MAZ. MZKT civilian trucks are branded VOLAT (literally means Giant). MZKT specializes in the production of on-road and off-road heavy-duty vehicles and trailers for them, as well as special wheeled chassis for installation of various equipment for enterprises and transport organizations of the construction, oil and gas and engineering industries.

History

In 1954, MZKT, the Minsk Wheeled Tractor Plant, was founded to develop artillery tractors; it then developed a series of heavy weapons transporters for the military of the USSR, including heavy offroad trucks such as the MAZ-537 and MAZ-7310. It was a division of Minsk Automobile Plant (known as MAZ). In 1991, MZKT was spun off into a separate company; its former parent, MAZ, continues to make a broader range of heavy vehicles.

In 1992, military orders slowed, and MZKT attempted to adapt its products to civilian uses, such as mining trucks and crane carriers.

In 2020 it was said that the MZKT was the primary supplier for the chassis of such Russian army vehicles as the launcher for the Topol-M because the domestic Russian products are of comparatively low quality.

Products
Many post-independence MZKT trucks continued to use a MAZ cab which resembled the  cab; starting in 2010 these were replaced with Belkarplastik cabs which resembled the 5th generation Isuzu Forward, which are also used by Yarovit trucks. The civilian brand of the group Volat manufacturers tractor trucks, ballast tractors and trailers for transportation and commercial use.

Military vehicles

MZKT-6922 

MZKT-6922, used with Tor and other surface-to-air missile systems.

MZKT-79221 

MZKT-79221 transporter erector launcher for the Topol-M missile; a successor to the MAZ-7917, which was, in turn, a successor to the MAZ-547

MZKT-7930 

The MZKT-7930 "Astrolog" is carrying the Iskander ballistic missiles, and the Pantsir-S1 air defense system, and radars for the S-300 missile system. Also Uragan-1M MLRS.

MZKT-74135/74295 

MZKT-74135 8x8 tank transporter

MZKT-490100 
 
 
MZKT-490100 armored vehicle used with four ready-to-launch Shershen ATGMs or with the Groza-S jamming system.

WS2400 

Some trucks made by Wanshan Special Vehicle, in China, are based on MZKT designs; the WS2400 is based on the MAZ-543.

Volat V2 

Volat V2 APC (MZKT-690003) with 2A42 30mm autocannon and other weaponry was first presented at Milex-2021 exhibition.

Volat (civilian vehicles)

Trucks 
MZKT-79086, 12x12 oilfield truck
MZKT-7429, 8x8 offroad tractor
MZKT-790976, 8x8 oilfield truck
MZKT-75165 8x8 tipper
MZKT-741320, ballast tractor
MZKT-741600, ballast tractor

Trailer 

 MZKT-900110 (2 axles, 29T)
 MZKT-900130 (2 axles, 36T)
 MZKT-937800 (2 axles, 56T)
 MZKT-5247D0-010 (2 axles, 50T)
 MZKT-998670 (2 axles, 70T)
 MZKT-720200  (3 axles, 45T)
 MZKT-999453 (3 axles, 46T)
 MZKT-998910 (3 axles, 50T)
 MZKT-820100 (4 axles, 63T)
 MZKT-837200 (4 axles, 65T)
 MZKT-999451 (5 axles, 64T)
 MZKT-999450 (6 axles, 73T)

International sanctions
On 17 December 2020, MZKT was added to the sanctions list of the European Union.
The United Kingdom and Switzerland have also sanctioned the company.

See also
 Neman - the bus subsidiary of MZKT.
 KZKT - A similar, now defunct, Russian company
 BelAZ
 KrAZ
 MAZ

References

External links

MZKT product listing
Volat Defense
Review in the Russian Journal of Motor Vehicles
Overview of vehicle manufacturers in Belarus

Truck manufacturers of the Soviet Union
Defence companies of the Soviet Union
Companies based in Minsk
Truck manufacturers of Belarus